The City of St. Louis officially recognizes 79 neighborhoods within its limits. Census data is collected for each neighborhood, as well as crime data, historic property data, and dining establishment health ratings. National historic neighborhoods are identified by the official neighborhood to which they belong.

Also, several neighborhood names extend to areas well beyond their technical borders. For example, Downtown St. Louis is generally thought to include the St. Louis Union Station and Enterprise Center, even though Downtown technically ends at Tucker Avenue (12th Street). Additionally, the Fox Theatre and Powell Symphony Hall are popularly considered a part of Midtown St. Louis even though they are in Grand Center. Dogtown is an area south of Forest Park that includes at least 4 distinct neighborhoods.

Moreover, sometimes several neighborhoods are lumped together in categories such as "North City" and "South City." North City used to have large Polish and German, among others, immigrant populations, evidenced by the churches they built, such as St. Stanislaus Kostka Church.

The following is a list of neighborhoods of the city of St. Louis, Missouri.

 All Data from 2020 U.S. Census Bureau
American Indian or Alaskan Native
May be of any race.

The north side of the city is defined as north of Delmar Boulevard, the central corridor as between Delmar and I-44, and the south side as south of I-44.

In 2020 the north side was 90.0% Black, 4.5% White, 0.3% American Indian/Alaska Native, 0.8% Asian, 3.2% Two or More Races and 1.2% Some Other Race. 1.8% of the population was of Hispanic or Latino origin.

In 2020 the central corridor was 32.6% Black, 50.9% White, 0.2% American Indian/Alaska Native, 5.9% Two or More Races, 8.3% Asian, and 2.0% Some Other Race. 4.3% of the population was of Hispanic or Latino origin.

In 2020 the south side was 24.0% black, 60.6% white, 0.4% American Indian/Alaska Native, 7.6% Two or More Races, 3.9% Asian, and 3.6% Some Other Race. 7.1% of the population was of Hispanic or Latino origin.

Aldermanic wards
The city can also be divided by the wards of the Board of Aldermen. These wards, however, change with every new census, and data is not as readily available for comparison across wards. Nevertheless, the wards are important in the functioning of the city, as the approval of the local Alderman is generally understood to be necessary before large projects may begin.

See also
 Mill Creek Valley, former historic neighborhood

References

External links
St. Louis Neighborhoods - official city site with map
History of St. Louis Neighborhoods - Historical Neighborhoods with map
Architectural Survey of Historic La Salle Park February, 1977 - Map of historic buildings

St. Louis
St. Louis-related lists